Hulangamuwa is a suburb of Matale, Sri Lanka. The Abilla Raja Maha Viharaya and Petmalumaga temple are located in Hulangamuwa.

See also
List of towns in Central Province, Sri Lanka

External links

Populated places in Matale District